Jordy Brouwer (born 26 February 1988) is a Dutch professional footballer who plays for DHC Delft.

Club career
Born in The Hague, Brouwer moved from Ajax to English side Liverpool in January 2007. After impressive form for the Liverpool Reserves – including scoring a goal in the Premier Reserve League play-off final in May 2008. He looked set to join FC Utrecht after a season long loan deal was agreed in August 2008, but the deal never materialised.

He eventually left on loan for RKC Waalwijk in January 2009, until the end of the 2008–09 season, making five league appearances for the first team.

In December 2010, Brouwer went on trial at ADO Den Haag, signing a contract with the club in January 2011 until the summer of 2012. He left the club in October 2011 when the player and club agreed a mutual termination of the contract.

In February 2012 he joined Almere City, before moving to HBS Craeyenhout at the start of the 2012–13 season. The striker played 14 games during the 2012/2013 season HBS Craeyenhout and scored seven goals, before signed with DHC Delft in June 2013.

Controversy
In February 2013, tens of kilos of cannabis were found in the basement of Brouwers' house. He was cleared from all charges in June 2014.

References

1988 births
Living people
Footballers from The Hague
Association football forwards
Dutch footballers
Netherlands youth international footballers
Liverpool F.C. players
RKC Waalwijk players
ADO Den Haag players
Almere City FC players
HBS Craeyenhout players
DHC Delft players
Eredivisie players
Eerste Divisie players